Paired immunoglobulin-like type 2 receptor beta is a protein that in humans is encoded by the PILRB gene.

Function 
Cell signaling pathways rely on a dynamic interaction between activating and inhibiting processes. SHP-1-mediated dephosphorylation of protein tyrosine residues is central to the regulation of several cell signaling pathways. Two types of inhibitory receptor superfamily members are immunoreceptor tyrosine-based inhibitory motif (ITIM)-bearing receptors and their non-ITIM-bearing, activating counterparts.

Control of cell signaling via SHP-1 is thought to occur through a balance between PILRalpha-mediated inhibition and PILRbeta-mediated activation. These paired immunoglobulin-like receptor genes are located in a tandem head-to-tail orientation on chromosome 7. This particular gene encodes the non-ITIM-bearing member of the receptor pair, which has a truncated cytoplasmic tail relative to its ITIM-bearing partner and functions in the activating role. Alternative splicing has been observed at this locus and three variants, encoding two distinct isoforms, are described. Additional transcript variants have been identified but their full-length nature has not been determined.

The mouse homolog of PILRbeta has been studied in mice and found to have one known natural ligand, CD99, though it is unclear if this interaction occurs in the human homologs.

Structure 
As with other paired receptors, PILRbeta has a truncated cytoplasmic tail compared to PILRalpha and features a charged residue within its transmembrane domain. PILRbeta has an extracellular domain with a siglec-like immunoglobulin fold that substitutes hydrophobic interactions for the siglec fold's characteristic disulfide bond. The structure of this domain is very similar to that of PILRalpha, but the two proteins nevertheless have different binding affinities for sialic acid.

References